Bartensleben is a village and a former municipality in the Börde district in Saxony-Anhalt, Germany. Since 1 January 2010, it is part of the municipality Erxleben. It is mostly known because of the former Repository for radioactive waste Morsleben nearby. The disposal of waste into the facility was ended in 1998.

References

Former municipalities in Saxony-Anhalt
Börde (district)